William Harmong Lamar (born December 11, 1859 – February 10, 1928) was an American lawyer.

He was born in Auburn, Alabama to Dr. William Harmong Lamar and his wife Ann. He received an A.B. from Alabama Polytechnic in 1881, his law degree from Georgetown University in 1884 and a Masters in Law in 1885 from the same.

He married Ms. Virginia Longstreet in 1887, with whom he would have four surviving children. He began his practice of law in Washington, D.C. and Rockville, Maryland shortly after graduation and was elected to the Maryland House of Delegates in 1894 as a Democrat. During the Spanish–American War, he served as a captain in the Signal Corps and in public relations campaigns for the war.

He served as an assistant attorney for the United States Department of Justice from 1906 to 1913. Following the election of Woodrow Wilson, a fellow Democrat, as President, he was made assistant attorney general and Solicitor of the Post Office Department, because of which he was targeted by anarchists for assassination in the 1919 United States anarchist bombings. He left office after the election of Warren Harding, a Republican, as President in 1921 and served in private practice with his son until his death.

He was a member of the American Bar Association, the Maryland Bar Association, Alpha Tau Omega and Phi Delta Phi. He was also a Methodist. All information is recovered from the 1928–1929 Who's Who in America edition.

1859 births
Methodists from Alabama
American military personnel of the Spanish–American War
Assistant United States Attorneys
Auburn High School (Alabama) alumni
Auburn University alumni
Georgetown University Law Center alumni
People from Auburn, Alabama
United States Army officers
United States Postal Service people
1928 deaths
Methodists from Maryland
Democratic Party members of the Maryland House of Delegates
19th-century American lawyers
19th-century American politicians
Maryland lawyers
People from Rockville, Maryland
Lawyers from Washington, D.C.
20th-century American lawyers